25I-NBOMe (2C-I-NBOMe, Cimbi-5, Smiles and also shortened to "25I") is a synthetic hallucinogen that is used in biochemistry research for mapping the brain's usage of the type 2A serotonin receptor; it is also sometimes used for recreational purposes. A derivative of the substituted phenethylamine 2C-I family, it is the most well-known member of the 25-NB family. It was discovered in 2003 by chemist Ralf Heim at the Free University of Berlin, who published his findings in his PhD dissertation. The compound was subsequently investigated by a team at Purdue University led by David Nichols.

The carbon-11 labelled version of 25I-NBOMe, [11C]Cimbi-5, was synthesized and validated as a radiotracer for positron emission tomography (PET) in Copenhagen. Being the first 5-HT2A receptor full agonist PET radioligand, [11C]-CIMBI-5 shows promise as a more functional marker of these receptors, particularly in their high affinity states.

Street and media nicknames for this drug are: "N-Bomb", "Solaris", "Smiles", and "Wizard", although the drug is frequently fraudulently sold as LSD.

Due to its physical effects and risk of overdose, there have been multiple deaths attributed to the drug. Its long term toxicity is unknown due to lack of existing research.

Recreational use
Although 25I-NBOMe was discovered in 2003, it did not emerge as a common recreational drug until 2010, when it was first sold by vendors specializing in the supply of designer drugs. In a slang context, the name of the compound is often shortened to "25I" or is simply called "N-Bomb". According to a 2014 survey, 25I-NBOMe was the most frequently used of the NBOMe series. By 2013, case reports of 25I-NBOMe intoxication, with and without analytic confirmation of the drug in the body, were becoming increasingly common in the medical literature.

25I-NBOMe is widely rumored to be orally inactive; however, apparent overdoses have occurred via oral administration. Common routes of administration include sublingual, buccal, and intranasal. For sublingual and buccal administration, 25I-NBOMe is often applied to sheets of blotter paper of which small portions (tabs) are held in the mouth to allow absorption through the oral mucosa. There are reports of intravenous injection of 25I-NBOMe solution and smoking the drug in powdered form.

Due to its potency and much lower cost than so-called classical or traditional psychedelics, 25I-NBOMe blotters are frequently misrepresented as, or mistaken for, LSD blotters. Even small quantities of 25I-NBOMe can produce a large number of blotters. Vendors would import 25I-NBOMe in bulk (e.g. 1 kg containers) and resell individual doses for a considerable profit.

Dosage
25I-NBOMe is potent, being active in sub-milligram doses. A common dose of the hydrochloride salt is 600–1,200 μg. The UK Advisory Council on the Misuse of Drugs states that a common dose is between 50 and 100 μg, although other sources indicate that these figures are incorrect; Erowid tentatively suggests that the threshold dosage for humans is 50–250 μg, with a light dose between 200–600 μg, a common dose at 500–800 μg, and a strong dose at 700–1500 μg. 

At this level of potency, it is not possible to accurately measure a single dose of 25I-NBOMe powder without an analytical balance, and attempting to do so may put the user at significant risk of overdose. There is a high risk of overdose due to the small margin between a high-dose and an over-dose, which is not a risk with the similar drug LSD. One study has shown that 25I-NBOMe blotters have 'hotspots' of the drug and the dosage is not evenly applied over the surface of the paper, which could lead to overdose.

Effects
25I-NBOMe effects usually last 6–10 hours if taken sublingually, or buccally (between gum and cheek). When it is insufflated (snorted), effects usually last 4–6 hours.

25I-NBOMe has similar effects to LSD, though users report more negative effects while under the influence and more risk of harm following use as compared to the classical psychedelics.

Case reports of seven British males who presented to an emergency room following analytically confirmed 25I-NBOMe intoxication suggest the following potential adverse effects: "tachycardia (n = 7), hypertension (4), agitation (6), aggression, visual and auditory hallucinations (6), seizures (3), hyperpyrexia (3), clonus (2), elevated white blood cell count (2), elevated creatine kinase (7), metabolic acidosis (3), and acute kidney injury (1)."

25I-NBOMe can be consumed in liquid, powder or paper form and can be snorted, injected, mixed with food, or smoked, but sublingual administration is most common.

Toxicity
Recreational use of 25I-NBOMe carries a significant risk of both pharmacological and behavioral toxicity. 25I-NBOMe is a relatively new substance, and little is known about its pharmacological risks or its interaction with other substances, although multiple deaths have occurred while under the effects of 25I-NBOMe and other drugs. The  has not yet been determined. The long-term toxicity of 25I-NBOMe is unknown due to lack of research. 

NBOMe chemicals, including 25I-NBOMe, frequently cause tachycardia (rapid heart rate), hypertension (high blood pressure), and vasoconstriction (which reduces blood flow). These physical symptoms can cause significant risks to health, especially when the user has underlying health issues or has taken a combination of drugs.

25I-NBOMe presumably exhibits functional selectivity at the 5HT2A receptor similar to other phenethylamine hallucinogens, activating the Phospholipase A2 signal cascade, which is responsible for the release of Thromboxane A2, triggering blood platelet aggregation. Excessive concentrations of TXA2 could lead to thrombosis, which when coupled with 25I-NBOMe's vasoconstrictive effect, is a major risk factor for cardiac ischemia, a dangerous condition the symptoms of which are present in several toxicological reports.

One 16-year-old was studied in 2017 after reporting seizures attributed to 25I-NBOMe usage, which after 18 months culminated in progressive left-sided weakness, ataxia, facial droop, and executive dysfunction. An MRI revealed the patient to have brain damage revealed by an MRI to be bilateral leukoencephalopathy concurrent with symptoms of serotonin syndrome. According to the researchers 'patients with 25I-NBOMe toxicity frequently display signs of serotonin syndrome'.

Attributed deaths 
Reports of deaths and significant injuries have been attributed to the use of 25I-NBOMe, prompting some governments to control its possession, production, and sale. The website Erowid states that 25I-NBOMe is extremely potent and should not be snorted, and that the drug "appears to have led to several deaths in the past year." Several non-fatal overdoses requiring prolonged hospitalization have also been reported. 

As of August 2015, 25I-NBOMe has reportedly led to at least 19 overdose deaths in the United States. In June 2012, two teens in Grand Forks, North Dakota and East Grand Forks, Minnesota fatally overdosed on a substance that was allegedly 25I-NBOMe, resulting in lengthy sentences for two of the parties involved and a Federal indictment against the Texas-based online vendor. A 21-year-old man from Little Rock, Arkansas died in October 2012 after taking a liquid drop of the drug nasally at a music festival. He was reported to have consumed caffeinated alcoholic beverages for "several hours" beforehand. It is unclear what other drugs he may have consumed, as autopsies generally do not test for the presence of research chemicals. In January 2013, an 18-year-old in Scottsdale, Arizona, died after consuming 25I-NBOMe sold as LSD; a toxicology screening found no other drugs in the person's system. The drug is the suspected cause of death in another Scottsdale, Arizona, incident in April 2013. It is also cited in the death of a 21-year-old woman in August 2013 and the death of a 17-year-old in Minnesota in January 2014, as well as the death of a 15-year old in Washington in September 2014.

25I-NBOMe has been implicated in multiple deaths in Australia. In March 2012, a man in Australia died from injuries sustained by running into trees and power poles while intoxicated by 25I-NBOMe. A Sydney teenager jumped off a balcony to his death on June 5, 2013 while on 25I-NBOMe.

25I-NBOMe has been linked to a major case on January 20, 2016 in Cork, Republic of Ireland, which left six teenagers hospitalized, one of whom later died. At least one of the teenagers suffered a cardiac arrest, according to reports, along with extreme internal bleeding.

At least one suicide, and two attempted suicides leading to hospitalisation, have occurred while under the effects of 25I-NBOMe.

Pharmacology

25I-NBOMe acts as a highly potent full agonist for the human 5-HT2A receptor, with a dissociation constant (Kd) of 0.044 nM, making it some sixteen times the potency of 2C-I itself at this receptor. A radiolabelled form of 25I-NBOMe can be used for mapping the distribution of 5-HT2A receptors in the brain.

25I-NBOMe induces a head-twitch response in mice which is blocked completely by a selective 5-HT2A antagonist, suggesting its psychedelic effects are mediated by 5-HT2A. This study suggested that 25I-NBOMe is approximately 14-fold more potent than 2C-I in-vivo.

While in-vitro studies showed that N-benzyl derivatives of 2C-I were significantly increased in potency compared to 2C-I, the N-benzyl derivatives of the related compound DOI were inactive.

25I-NBOMe also has weaker interactions with multiple other receptors.  Kd values for interaction with the following targets were greater than 500 nM: 5-HT1A, D3, H2, 5-HT1D, α1A adrenergic, δ opioid, serotonin uptake transporter, 5-HT5A, 5-HT1B, D2, 5-HT7, D1, 5-HT3, 5-HT1E, D5, muscarinic M1-M5, H3, and the dopamine uptake transporter.

Chemistry
Like other 2C-X-NBOMe molecules, 25I-NBOMe is a derivative of the 2C family of phenethylamines described by chemist Alexander Shulgin in his book PiHKAL. Specifically, 25I-NBOMe is an N-benzyl derivative of the phenethylamine molecule 2C-I, formed by adding a 2-methoxybenzyl (BnOMe) onto the nitrogen (N) of the phenethylamine backbone. This substitution significantly increases the potency of the molecule.

Analogues

Synthesis
25I-NBOMe is usually synthesised from 2C-I and 2-methoxybenzaldehyde, via reductive alkylation. It can be done stepwise by first making the imine and then reducing the formed imine with sodium borohydride, or by direct reaction with sodium triacetoxyborohydride.

Society and culture

Legal status

Australia
25I-NBOMe was explicitly scheduled in Queensland drug law in April 2012, and in New South Wales in October 2013, as were some related compounds such as 25B-NBOMe. The Australian federal government has no specific legislation concerning any of the N-benzyl phenethylamines.

Canada
As of October 31, 2016; 25I-NBOMe is a controlled substance (Schedule III) in Canada.

China
As of October 2015 25I-NBOMe is a controlled substance in China.

European Union
In September 2014 the European Union implemented a ban of 25I-NBOMe in all its member states.

Israel
Israel banned 25I-NBOMe in 2013.

Russia
Russia was the first country to pass specific regulations on the NBOMe series. All drugs in the NBOMe series, including 25I-NBOMe, became illegal in Russia in October 2011.

United Kingdom

United States
On Nov 15, 2013, the DEA added 25I-NBOMe (and 25C-, and 25B-NBOMe) to Schedule I using their emergency scheduling powers, making those NBOMe compounds "temporarily" in Schedule I for 2 years. In November 2015, the temporary scheduling was extended for an additional year while permanent scheduling was arranged. 25I-NBOMe, 25B-NBOMe and 25C-NBOMe are currently Schedule 1 Substances according to 21 CFR 1308.11(d).

Romania
In 2011, Romania banned all psychoactive substances.

Serbia
25I-NBOMe was put on the list of prohibited substances in March 2015.

Sweden
The Riksdag added 25I-NBOMe to Narcotic Drugs Punishments Act under Swedish schedule I ("substances, plant materials and fungi which normally do not have medical use") as of August 1, 2013, published by Medical Products Agency (MPA) in regulation LVFS 2013:15 listed as 25I-NBOMe, and 2-(4-jodo-2,5-dimetoxifenyl)-N-(2-metoxibensyl)etanamin.

Taiwan
Following the European rule from 2014, 25I-NBOMe was put in class 4 of prohibited substances.

Brazil
All drugs in the NBOMe family, including 25I-NBOMe, are illegal.

References 

25-NB (psychedelics)
Iodoarenes
Designer drugs
5-HT2A agonists
5-HT2C agonists